The International College of Dentists was conceived in 1920 at a farewell party in Tokyo for Dr. Louis Ottofy when he was returning home to the United States after practicing dentistry in the Philippines and Japan for 23 years.  A colleague, Dr. Tsurukichi Okumura, a Japanese dentist, also urged Dr. Ottofy to form an international organization.

Six years later, at the Seventh International Dental Congress in Philadelphia, U.S. the group of dentists met again to finalize the concept of the ICD then on New Year's Eve of 1927 the College was announced with Drs. Ottofy and Okumura as the Co-Founders.  The first President of the College was Andres O. Weber, from Havana, Cuba.

Originally, 250 dentists from 162 countries accepted the Fellowship oath. The group was selected based on an international reputation and participation in the FDI World Dental Federation.  Each Fellow was given the task of nominating other dentists for membership. Dentists who are inducted into the organization place the post-nominals FICD with their name.

Growth of the organization
In the years following the initial formation of the ICD, membership grew such that autonomous sections were required. In 1934, the first of these sections, located in the United States of America, was formed. 14 more autonomous Sections were formed in the ensuing years: Section II, Canada; Section III, Mexico; Section IV, South America, Section V, Europe; Section VI, India; Section VII, Japan; Section VIII, Australasia; Section IX, Philippines, Section X, Middle East; Section XI, Korea; Section XII, Chinese Taipei; Section XIII, China, Section XIV, Myanmar; and Section XV. Section XX  comprises 15 Regions around the world that are too small to be Sections.  Today, the organization claims a membership of approximately 12,000 (2020) from 122 countries.

Cultivate humanitarian efforts
In 2008, fifteen ICD Fellows of Myanmar with eight assistants went to cyclone-affected townships in the Delta and Dadeyae areas, providing free dental care and making some donations to the people in the camps under the name of the ICD organization. Over 235 patients were treated. Similar dental missions occur throughout the year and around the world to underserviced areas under the name of the ICD.  Other projects are sponsored by ICD around the world.

Improve the welfare of the public internationally
In Vietnam and Cambodia training for public health dentistry has been limited because of funds and experts in the field.  Through an ICD sponsored program, roughly 40% of the public health dentists were given additional training.  Another 20% of them went on to receive higher education (graduate) degrees in public health dentistry.  While these programs do not directly provide care to patients in either country, they develop practical skills for dentists in designing programs for their populations.  The organization has collaborated to improve infection prevention and safety practices.

Communications
Publications are released by each of the autonomous sections and most maintain their own web sites.  The ICD Headquarters also publishes a digital journal called The Globe and a quarterly newsletter called The College Today.

References

Dental organizations
1927 establishments in the United States